The Ariel Award for Best Ibero-American film is a film award category created in 2000, part of the Ariel Awards, which are presented by the Academia Mexicana de Artes y Ciencias Cinematográficas (AMACC).

Winners and nominees 
A list of winners and nominees is presented as follows (winners are listed first, highlighted in boldface, and indicated with a double dagger):

2000s

2010s

2020s

References 

Ariel Awards
Ibero-American awards